The 1993 USC Trojans football team represented the University of Southern California (USC) in the 1993 NCAA Division I-A football season. In their eighth non-consecutive year under head coach John Robinson (Robinson was also USC's coach from 1976 to 1982), the Trojans compiled an 8–5 record (6–2 against conference opponents), won the Pacific-10 Conference (Pac-10) championship, and outscored their opponents by a combined total of 348 to 252.

Quarterback Rob Johnson led the team in passing, completing 308 of 449 passes for 3,630 yards with 29 touchdowns and six interceptions.  Shawn Walters led the team in rushing with 156 carries for 711 yards and seven touchdowns. Johnnie Morton led the team in receiving with 88 catches for 1,520 yards and 14 touchdowns.

Schedule

Game summaries

Washington State
Statistics
Receiving: Johnnie Morton 8 receptions, 229 yards, TD

Roster

1994 NFL Draft
The following players were claimed in the 1993 NFL Draft.

References

USC
USC Trojans football seasons
Pac-12 Conference football champion seasons
Freedom Bowl champion seasons
USC Trojans football